Senator. Alh. Dr. Bello Maitama Yusuf GCON Sardaunan Dutse (born April, 1947) is a Nigerian politician, Businessman and Senator of the Federal Republic of Nigeria. He was the Minister for Internal Affairs in 1979 and Minister for Commerce in 1982. He was educated at North Gate University, Washington and was a member of the defunct National Party of Nigeria.
Prior, to joining politics, he founded Quartz Integerated Services Nigeria Limited right after he had finished university, it was a renowned and very influential construction company which had first started operating in Kano. Furthermore, he was also the chairman on the board of four other construction  companies at the time, thus, making him one of the youngest multi millionaires in the world. In addition to this, he was a lawyer and had served as a chief registrar at the Chief Magistrate's Court in Kano. He was also a member of the Constituent Assembly and is one of Jigawas few billionaires till now. Bello Maitama has set up the stage for all politicians and businessmen in Nigeria. As minister for Commerce, he was in charge of curtailing imported goods to Nigeria which was massively draining the nation's foreign reserves.

He was elected to the Nigerian Senate for the Jigawa South West constituency in April 1999, and reelected in April 2003. 
He played prominent roles in attacking the Third Term Agenda and indicting President Obasanjo for mismanaging a petroleum development fund, he was also a prominent member of the Senate committee on youth and sports. He was also given the title "Sarduanan Dutse" in his state Jigawa. Bello Maitama has now retired from politics and business, with his oldest son Yusuf continuing his legacy.

Notes

1947 births
Living people
Members of the Senate (Nigeria)
National Party of Nigeria politicians
Federal ministers of Nigeria
Jigawa State politicians
20th-century Nigerian politicians
21st-century Nigerian politicians